Jiulongshan Station is an interchange station between Line 7 and Line 14 of the Beijing Subway. Line 14 station was  opened on December 26, 2015.

Station layout 
Both the line 7 and 14 stations have underground island platforms.

Exits 
There are 5 exits, lettered A, B, D, E, and G. Exit B is accessible.

References

Railway stations in China opened in 2014
Beijing Subway stations in Chaoyang District